The Archway Tavern in Archway, London, is on Highgate Hill near Archway tube station.

The site has housed pubs since the 1700s, with the current building being built in 1888. At one point, a cable car service up Highgate Hill terminated outside the tavern.

In 2014, the Archway Tavern was closed because of a licensing dispute. It was briefly re-opened as the Intrepid Fox, and at one point operated as a venue called Dusk till Dawn, but remained largely closed for several years. In 2020, plans were made to reopen it, following the resolution of licensing issues regarding the pub and its adjacent nightclub. , the pub is back to being open full time.

During the shutdown, the building was locally listed by Islington Council as "a historic feature and a focal point of the Town Centre" to resist any change of use of the building from being a public house. The building is now owned by the property company Searchgrade Limited, which bought it for £3.8m in 2019.

The interior of the pub was used as the cover of The Kinks' studio album Muswell Hillbillies.

References 

Pubs in the London Borough of Islington
1888 establishments in England
Former pubs in London